The Salem City School District is a public school district serving Salem and other parts of northern Columbiana County in the U.S. state of Ohio.

Salem High School is the only high school in the district.  The schools' sports teams are nicknamed the "Quakers" and the mascot is "Quaker Sam" The district's colors are red and black.

Schools currently in operation by the school district

Historic schools no longer in operation by the school district

References

External links

Education in Columbiana County, Ohio
School districts in Ohio